Bati Kot is a district in the east of Nangarhar Province, Afghanistan. Its population, which is 100% Pashtun, was estimated at 300,000 in 2017, of whom 25,500 were children under 12. The district is within the heartland of the Mohmand tribe of Pashtuns. The district centre is Nader Shah Kot.

Batikot has the following villages: Garbawa, Lowartay, Sepay, Chardi, Khanano Kali(gary), Takya, Barekab, Meshwane, Ghazeabad, Gundyane, Kody, and Ambarkhana.
Since the 2nd presidential term of Hamid Karzia, about 70% area of Bati Kot is covered by Taliban. The main centre of Taliban is in Salour Kali (چهاردهي).

The popular areas in the district are; د دريم مالټې، اصحاب بابا  زیارت ، سید اخند موسی زیارت ، تکیه غونډۍ ، پیرکامل زیارت

Notable residents

Afghanistan cricketer Hameed Hasan was born in the district. Salor Kalai (څلور کلی) Or Chardahi is one of the villages of Bati Kot district, where a very famous person lives whose name is Amadzai Ustad, Amadzai Ustad is repairing broken bones of the human body, many people come from near and from some very far places to him to repair bones from all around Afghanistan.

The popular people of the district are: Malik Qaqif, Mohammad Tahir Darwish, Malik Habibullah, Haji Aziz Ur Rahman (Former member of parliament),Mohammad Darwish (Former District Governor) Dr. Sediq Momand, Dr Haji Sheraz Khan, Haji Mandali, Dil Aram, Haji Muhibullah, Haji Farooq, Malik Zahir, Haji Atiqullah, Malik Shah Mahmood, Malik Nawaz Khan, Malik Naseem, Qumandan Sharif

References

External links
 Map of Bati Kot (PDF)

Districts of Nangarhar Province